Ten Bulls or Ten Ox Herding Pictures (Chinese: shíniú  十牛 , Japanese: jūgyūzu  十牛図 , korean: sipwoo  십우) is a series of short poems and accompanying drawings used in the Zen tradition to describe the stages of a practitioner's progress toward enlightenment, and their return to society to enact wisdom and compassion.

History

Scriptural origins

The calf, bull, or ox is one of the earliest similes for meditation practice. It comes from the Maha Gopalaka Sutta (Majjhima Nikaya 33). It is also used in the commentaries, especially the one on the Maha Satipatthana Sutta (Digha Nikaya 22) and the Satipatthana Sutta (Majjhima Nikaya 10). As Buddhism spread throughout South-East Asia, the simile of the bull spread with it.

Chinese pictures
The well-known ten ox-herding pictures emerged in China in the 12th century. D.T. Suzuki mentions four Chinese versions of the Oxherding Pictures, by Ching-chu (Jp. Seikyo)(11th century), Tzu-te Hui (Jp. Jitoku)(1090-1159), an unknown author, and Kuòān Shīyuǎn (Jp. Kaku-an) (12th century).

Early versions
The first series was probably made by Ching-chu in the 11th century, who may have been a contemporary of Kuòān Shīyuǎn. There are only five pictures in Ching-chu's version and the ox's colour changes from dark to white, representing the gradual development of the practitioner, ending in the disappearance of the practitioner.

Tzu-te Hui (自得慧暉, Zide Huihui, Jp. Jitoku) (1090-1159) made a version with six pictures. The sixth one goes beyond the stage of absolute emptiness, where Ching-chu's version ends. Just like Ching-chu's version, the ox grows whiter along the way.

A third version by an unknown author, with ten pictures, was the most popular in China. It derives from the Ching-chu and Tzu-te Hui series of pictures, and has a somewhat different series of pictures compared to Kuòān Shīyuǎn's version. The 1585-edition contains a preface by Chu-hung, and it has ten pictures, each of which is preceded by Pu-ming's poem, of whom Chu-hung provides no further information. In this version the ox's colour changes from dark to white.

Famous versions
The best known version of the oxherding pictures was drawn by the 12th century Chinese Rinzai Chán (Zen) master Kuòān Shīyuǎn (廓庵師遠, Jp. Kaku-an Shi-en), who also wrote accompanying poems and introductory words attached to the pictures. In Kuòān Shīyuǎn's version, there is no whitening process, and his series also doesn't end with mere emptiness, or absolute truth, but shows a return to the world, depicting Putai, the laughing Buddha. In Japan, Kuòān Shīyuǎn's version gained a wide circulation, the earliest one probably belonging to the fifteenth century.

Liaoan Qingyu (了菴清欲, Jp. Ryōan Seiyoku) (1288-1363) made another version with five pictures.

Kuòān Shīyuǎn's Ten Bulls
Verses by Kuòān Shīyuǎn; translation by Senzaki Nyogen (千崎如幻) (1876–1958) and Paul Reps (1895-1990); paintings traditionally attributed to Tenshō Shūbun (天章周文) (1414-1463).

Influence and cultural legacy
The ox-herding pictures had an immediate and extensive influence on the Chinese practice of Chan Buddhism. According to Chi Kwang Sunim, they may represent a Zen Buddhist interpretation of the ten Bodhisattva bhumi, the ten stages on the Bodhisattva-path.

The pictures first became widely known in the West after their inclusion in the 1957 book, Zen Flesh, Zen Bones: A Collection of Zen and Pre-Zen Writings, by Paul Reps and Nyogen Senzaki. Alan Watts included a description of the Ten Bulls in The Spirit of Zen. The pictures went on to influence the work of John Cage, particularly in his emphasis on rhythmic silence, and on images of nothingness. The pictures, especially the last one ('In the Marketplace'), have provided a conceptual umbrella for those Buddhists seeking a greater engagement with the post-industrial global marketplace.

Cat Stevens' sixth studio album Catch Bull at Four is a reference to the 4th step towards enlightenment. On the album, the song Sitting refers to meditation, and the apprehensions that may result from the experiences resulting from enlightenment. Catch Bull at Four  was commercially successful and spent 3 weeks at number one in the Billboard album charts in 1972.

In the 1989 South Korean film Why Has Bodhi-Dharma Left for the East?, an ox escapes into the forest and one of the protagonists, a young boy, attempts to hunt it down through the bushes. During the opening scene of Apichatpong Weerasethakul's 2010 film Uncle Boonmee Who Can Recall His Past Lives, a water buffalo stands tied to a tree before breaking loose and wandering into a forest.

Ten Elephants
An equivalent series of stages is depicted in the Nine Stages of Tranquility, used in the Mahamudra tradition, in which the mind is represented by an elephant and a monkey. This formulation was presented by Asaṅga (4th CE), delineating the nine mental abidings in his Abhidharmasamuccaya  and the Śrāvakabhūmi chapter of his Yogācārabhūmi-śāstra It is also found in the Mahāyānasūtrālaṅkāra of Maitreyanātha, which shows considerable similarity in arrangement and content to the Bodhisattva-bhūmi-śāstra. In this scheme, śamatha practice is said to progress through nine "mental abidings" or Nine stages of training the mind (S. navākārā cittasthiti, Tib. sems gnas dgu), leading to śamatha proper (the equivalent of "access concentration" in the Theravāda system), and from there to a state of meditative concentration called the first dhyāna (Pāli: jhāna; Tib. bsam gtan) which is often said to be a state of tranquillity or bliss. An equivalent succession of stages is described in the Ten oxherding pictures of Zen. The Nine Mental Abidings as described by Kamalaśīla are:
Distractions, dullness of mind and other hindrances are common. 
 Continuous placement (S. samsthāpana, Tib.  - rgyun-du ‘jog-pa) occurs when the practitioner experiences moments of continuous attention on the object before becoming distracted. According to B Alan Wallace, this is when you can maintain your attention on the meditation object for about a minute.
 Repeated placement (S. avasthāpana, Tib.  བླན་ཏེ་འཇོག་པ  -  slan-te ’jog-pa) is when the practitioner's attention is fixed on the object for most of the practice session and she or he is able to immediately realize when she or he has lost their mental hold on the object and is able to restore that attention quickly. Sakyong Mipham Rinpoche suggests that being able to maintain attention for 108 breaths is a good benchmark for when we have reached this stage.
 Close placement (S. upasthāpana, Tib. ཉེ་བར་འཇོག་པ -  nye-bar ’jog-pa) occurs when the practitioner is able to maintain attention throughout the entire meditation session (an hour or more) without losing their mental hold on the meditation object at all. In this stage the practitioner achieves the power of mindfulness. Nevertheless, this stage still contains subtle forms of excitation and dullness or laxity.
 Taming (S. damana, Tib. དུལ་བར་བྱེད་པ - dul-bar byed-pa), by this stage the practitioner achieves deep tranquility of mind, but must be watchful for subtle forms of laxity or dullness, peaceful states of mind which can be confused for calm abiding. By focusing on the future benefits of gaining Shamatha, the practitioner can uplift (gzengs-bstod) their mind and become more focused and clear.
 Pacifying (S. śamana,Tib. ཞི་བར་བྱེད་པ་ - zhi-bar byed-pa) is the stage during which subtle mental dullness or laxity is no longer a great difficulty, but now the practitioner is prone to subtle excitements which arise at the periphery of meditative attention. According to B. Alan Wallace this stage is achieved only after thousands of hours of rigorous training.
 Fully pacifying (S. vyupaśamana,Tib. རྣམ་པར་ཞི་བར་བྱེད་པ་ - nye-bar zhi-bar byed-pa), although the practitioner may still experience subtle excitement or dullness, they are rare and the practitioner can easily recognize and pacify them. 
 Single-pointing (S. ekotīkarana,Tib. རྩེ་གཅིག་ཏུ་བྱེད་པ་ - rtse-gcig-tu byed-pa) in this stage the practitioner can reach high levels of concentration with only a slight effort and without being interrupted even by subtle laxity or excitement during the entire meditation session. 
 Balanced placement (S. samādhāna,Tib. མཉམ་པར་འཇོག་པ་བྱེད་པ་ - mnyam-par ’jog-pa) the meditator now effortlessly reaches absorbed concentration (ting-nge-‘dzin, S. samadhi.) and can maintain it for about four hours without any single interruption.
 Śamatha, Tib. ཞི་གནས་, shyiné - the culmination, is sometimes listed as a tenth stage.

The Dharma Fellowship, a Kagyu (Mahamudra) organisation, notes that the practice starts with studying and pondering the dharma, where-after the practice of meditation commences.

See also
 Buddhist Paths to liberation
 Bodhi
 Five Ranks
 Monomyth
 Nirvana
 Spiritual bypass

Notes

References

Sources

Printed sources

Web-sources

Further reading
Background
 
 

Commentaries

External links
General
 Terebess Online, Oxherding Pictures Index, huge collection of resources on the oxherding pictures

Zide Huihui (Jp. Jitoku Keiki) (1090-1159) version (six pictures)
 Terebess Asia Online, The Six Oxherding Pictures by 自得慧暉 Zide Huihui (Jitoku Keiki), 1090-1159

Chinese Pu-Ming (Jp. Fumyō) version (ten pictures)
 Terebess Asia Online, The Ten Oxherding Pictures by 普明 Puming (Fumyō), an unknown author

Kuòān Shīyuǎn (12th century) version (ten pictures)
 Paul Reps (1957), Zen Flesh, Zen Bones: A Collection of Zen and Pre-Zen Writings
 Reverend Eshin, Ten Oxherding Pictures
 John M. Koller, Ox-herding: stages of Zen-practice

Extended commentaries
 Commentary by D.T. Suzuki
 Commentary by Shodo Harada 
 Commentary by Sheng Yen
 Commentary by Ruben Habito
 Commentary by Martine Batchelor
 Commentary by Chögyam Trungpa

Taming the Elephant
Dharma Fellowship, Deepening Calm-Abiding - The Nine Stages of Abiding
 Skyflower Dharmacenter, Mahamudra Tranquility and Insight

Other
 A comparison between the Zen Buddhist Ten Oxherding Pictures and the Theory of Positive Disintegration
 Dward Muzika, Awakening versus Liberation

Zen texts
Stage theories
Kōan
Zenga
Buddhist paintings
Buddhist poetry